Charles Victor "Chuck" Magro is a Canadian business executive who was the former CEO and President of Nutrien.  He was the president of Agrium from January 2014 until it completed its merger with PotashCorp to form Nutrien. Prior to his appointment he served as COO from 2012 to 2013, Chief Risk Officer from February 2012 to October 2012, and as Vice President of Manufacturing 2009–2012. Prior to his time at Agrium he was an executive at Nova Chemicals. He holds a degree from University of Waterloo, and holds an MBA from University of Windsor.

In 2016, Magro was named the fifth highest ranking CEO in Calgary, earning $10.4 million. In 2014 he had been named 19th overall with earnings of $6.7 million. He received a significant increase in his annual bonus and long-term incentives due to Agrium's strong performance in 2015, as well as a 26 per cent increase in his base salary as part of the company's ongoing efforts to transition to market median pay levels.

References

Living people
Year of birth missing (living people)
Place of birth missing (living people)
University of Waterloo alumni
University of Windsor alumni
Canadian chief executives